The 1997–98 season was the 96th season in Real Madrid CF's history and their 67th consecutive season in La Liga.

Real Madrid failed to retain their La Liga title, but made up for the domestic disappointment by winning the UEFA Champions League with a 1–0 victory over Juventus in the Amsterdam final. The European Cup title was Real Madrid's 7th overall and first since 1966. This, however, was not enough to save the job of manager Jupp Heynckes, who was sacked due to Madrid's low league finish just eight days after the European triumph. In the Copa del Rey, Real lost to Alaves in the round of 16 on away goals.

Kit
Real Madrid's kits were manufactured by Spanish apparel manufacturer Kelme and sponsored by Teka.

Squad
Squad at end of season

Left club during season

Competitions

La Liga

League table

Position by round

Matches

Copa del Rey

Round of 16

Champions League

Group stage

Quarter-finals

Semi-finals

Final

Statistics

Players statistics

Goalscorers

La Liga
 Fernando Morientes – 12

Copa del Rey
 Davor Šuker, Roberto Carlos – 1

Champions League
 Fernando Morientes, Davor Šuker – 4

References

Real Madrid CF seasons
Real Madrid C.F.
UEFA Champions League-winning seasons